The 2010 Booker Prize for Fiction was awarded at a ceremony on 12 October 2010. The Man Booker longlist of 13 books was announced on 27 July, and was narrowed down to a shortlist of six on 7 September. The Prize was awarded  to Howard Jacobson for The Finkler Question.

Judging panel
Sir Andrew Motion (Chair) 
Rosie Blau
Deborah Bull
Tom Sutcliffe
Frances Wilson

Nominees (Shortlist)

Nominees (Longlist)

References

Man Booker
Booker Prizes by year
2010 awards in the United Kingdom